Harvard Magazine is an independently edited magazine and separately incorporated affiliate of Harvard University. Aside from The Harvard Crimson, it is the only publication covering the entire university and regularly distributed to all graduates, faculty, and staff.

The magazine was founded in 1898 by alumni for alumni with the mission of "keeping alumni of Harvard University connected to the university and to each other".  One of the magazine's founders was William Morton Fullerton, a foreign correspondent for The Times.  

The magazine has gone through three name changes. It was originally called 'Harvard Bulletin. In 1910, the name was changed to Harvard Alumni Bulletin. In 1973, it took on its current name, Harvard Magazine. Harvard Magazine'' has a BPA Worldwide-audited circulation of 258,000 among alumni, faculty, and staff in the United States.

References

External links
Official website
"History of Harvard Magazine"

Alumni magazines
Bimonthly magazines published in the United States
Magazine
Magazines established in 1898
Magazines published in Boston